Duldug is a rural locality (a selo) and the administrative centre of Burshagsky Selsoviet, Agulsky District, Republic of Dagestan, Russia. The population was 542 as of 2010.

Geography 
Duldug is located 8 km east of Tpig (the district's administrative centre) by road. Goa is the nearest rural locality.

References 

Rural localities in Agulsky District